Beautiful Day is the twenty-eighth single by the Japanese hip-hop group Lead. It was their second single released post their studio album The Showcase. It charted well on Oricon, taking the #6 spot for the week and remaining on the charts for four consecutive weeks.

The single was released on August 23, 2017, five months after their previous single Tokyo Fever, which had been released in March of that year.

The music video for the title track was filmed in Hawaii.

Information
Beautiful Day is the twenty-eighth single by the Japanese hip-hop group Lead, released on August 23, 2017. The single became the group's tenth consecutive single to chart in the top ten on the Oricon Singles Charts, taking #6 for the week and remaining on the charts for four weeks. The single was released on August 23, 2017, five months after their previous single Tokyo Fever.

The single was released as a standard CD and three limited CD+DVD editions. The standard edition contained the title track and the two b-sides "Shampoo Bubble" and "Say Good-bye Say Hello." The type A and B limited editions carried the title track and b-side "Shampoo Bubble," while the limited type C edition held the title track and coupling track "Say Good-bye Say Hello." The type A DVD carried the music video to "Beautiful Day," along with the video's making. The type B DVD held a video for "Shampoo Bubble" and a behind-the-scenes look at the filming. However, the video was not considered a music video and, instead, was the trio in various places around the island of Hawaii. The type C DVD was a behind-the-scenes look at the making for the single's cover art and a video of the group spending a day throughout the island.

"Beautiful Day" was written and composed by Drew Ryan Scott and Sean Alexander. Sean and Drew would later go on to work with Lead again for their following song "Bumblebee." The lyrics to the coupling track "Shampoo Bubble" were written by Lead member Akira Kagimoto. The rap portion to the song was written by Japanese rapper KM-MARKIT, who had previously been under the Pony Canyon label in the mid-2000s before co-creating the record label Raider Music Record in 2010. The musical portion was written and performed by Chase Ryan, Beau Evans and Sean Alexander. For the coupling track "Say Good-bye Say Hello," the lyrics were once again written by Akira; however, the rap portion was written by Lead's primary rapper Shinya Tanuichi. The music was written and composed by Matt Cab and RYUJA.

Background and composition
"Beautiful Day" was written and composed by Drew Ryan Scott and Sean Alexander. Sean Alexander has worked with the likes of South Korean artists Kim Hyun-Joong, TVXQ and Girls' Generation. Sean would later go on to work with Lead again for their following song "Bumblebee." Drew Ryan Scott had previously worked with American artist Willow Smith and South Korean groups SHINee and EXO, and would also go on to work with Lead for their next single, along with Sean Alexander.

The lyrics to the coupling track "Shampoo Bubble" were written by Lead member Akira Kagimoto. The rap portion to the song was written by Japanese rapper KM-MARKIT, who had previously been under the Pony Canyon label in the mid-2000s before co-creating the record label Raider Music Record in 2010. The musical portion was written and performed by Chase Ryan, Beau Evans and Sean Alexander. For the coupling track "Say Good-bye Say Hello," the lyrics were once again written by Akira; however, the rap portion was written by Lead's primary rapper Shinya Tanuichi. The music was written and composed by Matt Cab and RYUJA, the latter who has worked with the South Korean group BTS (known in Japan as "Bulletproof Boys").

Track listing

Charts
Oricon Sales Chart (Japan)

References

External links
Lead Official Site

2017 singles
2017 songs
Japanese-language songs
Pony Canyon singles
Songs written by Drew Ryan Scott
Songs written by Sean Alexander
Lead (band) songs